Eric Carlson (born May 22, 1958, in Seattle, Washington) is a founding member and lead guitarist of American heavy metal band The Mentors. Under the stage name Sickie Wifebeater, Carlson started The Mentors in Seattle in 1976 with bass guitarist Steve Broy (Dr. Heathen Scum) and singer/drummer Eldon Hoke (El Duce) who attended Roosevelt High School together.

Style

Wifebeater's playing style when soloing (with hand above and over the fretboard) is one of the things that gave the Mentors' guitars a unique sound. His signature sound is fluid with alternating bottom-heavy crunch with fast-noted metal runs.

When performing, Wifebeater wears a black executioner’s hood, according to a Guitar World "Behind the Mask: A Brief History of Guitarists with an Identity Crisis", Guitar World, September 5, 2008</ref>

Equipment

Guitars
Wifebeater plays or has played the following guitars
 A 1964 red Gibson SG with one P-90 pickup and one DiMarzio super distortion Humbucker
 A 1965 red Gibson SG stock P-90 pickups
 Early 1980s silver Boogiebodies Stratocaster
 A 1970s black Ventura Les Paul Copy (used in early 1980s)

Amplifiers

Sickie Wifebeater uses a 1978 or 1979 Marshall MKII 100 Watt Lead with checkerboard speaker cabinets. Originally, he used the fullstack as pictured on the Get Up and Die album cover but in later years he mainly ran it as a halfstack.

Discography

With The Mentors
Get Up and Die (1981 Mystic Records)
 Live at the Whiskey/Cathey de Grande (1981 Mystic Records)
 You Axed for It! (1985 Metal Blade/Death Records)
 Up the Dose (1986 Metal Blade/Death Records)
 Sex Drugs and Rock 'n' Roll (1989 Ever Rat Records)
 Rock Bible (1990 Mentor Records)
 To The Max (1991 Mentor Records)
 Over The Top (2005 Mentor Records)
 Ducefixion (2009 Mentor Records)
 Illuminaughty (2017 Mentor Records)

With other groups
 Jesters of Destiny - Fun at the Funeral 1986
 Mentorhawk -  Motel 7 1999
 Northwest Breeders - Northwest Breeders EP 2001

Videography
 Get Up and Die (1983)
 Mentors Fuck Movie (1987)
 A Piece Of Sinema (1990)
 The Wretched World of The Mentors (1990)
 Mentors Tour De Max '91 (1991)
 El Duce, The Man. The Myth. The Video. (1993)
 Mentors - El Duce Vita DVD (2007)

Sources 
Church Of El Duce
Men In The Hood: Mentors Site

References

External links
Sickie Wifebeater at MySpace
The Mentors Official Website
Church of El Duce
Mentors @ the Metal Archives

Living people
1958 births
American heavy metal guitarists
American punk rock guitarists
Mentors (band) members
Musicians from Seattle
Guitarists from Washington (state)
American male guitarists
20th-century American guitarists